The Essential Barbra Streisand (retitled The Ultimate Collection in some European countries) is the fifth greatest hits album by American singer Barbra Streisand, released on January 29, 2002, by Columbia Records. The compilation features 38 songs from Streisand's catalog, in addition to two previously unreleased tracks (covers of "Someday My Prince Will Come" and "You'll Never Walk Alone"). It includes material from 26 of the singer's albums and was described as a collection of, mainly, her pop songs. A reissued version of the compilation was distributed by Columbia and Legacy Recordings in 2008 and includes a bonus disk featuring nine additional songs from Streisand's discography.

Critically, the album was noted for being a comprehensive and complete view of her discography, unlike her previous greatest hits releases. It topped the charts in Ireland, Scotland, and the United Kingdom, and peaked at number 15 on the Billboard 200 in the United States. The Essential Barbra Streisand also reached the top ten in several countries and was included on four year-end lists. The album has since been certified Platinum in Australia, Europe, New Zealand, Spain, and the United States, and multi-platinum in the United Kingdom.

Background and development 
The Essential Barbra Streisand was released on January 29, 2002, by Columbia Records. A compilation of Streisand's "pop-oriented performances", the collection contains two discs featuring 38 songs from Streisand's discography. Representing 26 albums from her career, the first-recorded song included on The Essential Barbra Streisand is "A Sleepin' Bee" from The Barbra Streisand Album (1963), while the most recent track featured is "I've Dreamed of You" from A Love Like Ours (1999). In addition, Streisand included two previously unreleased tracks on the second disc, covers of "Someday My Prince Will Come" and "You'll Never Walk Alone". William Ruhlmann from AllMusic suggested that the former song was recorded during sessions for A Love Like Ours while the latter was meant for her twenty-seventh studio album, Higher Ground (1997). In some European countries, the album was released under the title The Ultimate Collection with an identical track listing.

The Essential Barbra Streisand was reissued on September 30, 2008, through a co-partnership between Columbia Records and Legacy Recordings. The new version featured a bonus third disk with seven more songs from Streisand's back-catalog and two live renditions.

Critical reception 

The Essential Barbra Streisand was given a perfect five star rating by AllMusics William Ruhlmann. He felt that Streisand's discography had not been detailed well on her previous compilations and considered The Essential Barbra Streisand to be the best choice for fans not willing to purchase the expensive box set Just for the Record... (1992). Considering its comprehensiveness, Ruhlmann praised the album's inclusion of her eleven top ten hits and nearly all of her top 40 hits. Tom Santopietro, author of The Importance of Being Barbra: The Brilliant, Tumultuous Career of Barbra Streisand, was disappointed by Streisand's decision to release two greatest hits albums in the same year (the other being Duets). Describing her action as "cynical", he wrote: "At this point, even the most die-hard Streisand fan could be forgiven for expressing frustration at yet another release of 'People' and 'The Way We Were'." However, he praised the inclusion of "Someday My Prince Will Come" and "You'll Never Walk Alone", calling them both "extraordinary" cover tracks. In addition to The Barbra Streisand Album and Stoney End (1971), Phyllis Fulford and Michael Miller, authors of the 2003 book The Complete Idiot's Guide to Singing, listed The Essential Barbra Streisand as one of the singer's "CDs that best represent [her] more pop-oriented performances".

Commercial performance 
The Essential Barbra Streisand entered the Billboard 200 at number 15, its peak position, during the week of February 16, 2002. It was the chart's second highest entry of the week, just behind the soundtrack to the 2002 film State Property, which debuted at number 14. It spent a total of nine weeks on the Billboard 200. On March 15, 2002, it was certified Gold as a multi-disk package by Recording Industry Association of America (RIAA) for physical shipments of 250,000 copies; its certification was then upgraded to Platinum, signifying shipments of 500,000 copies, on October 17, 2003. As of June 22, 2007, The Essential Barbra Streisand has sold 506,000 copies in the United States. Elsewhere in North America, it debuted in Canada at number 73 according to the chart published by Nielsen SoundScan.

In Europe, The Essential Barbra Streisand topped the charts in several countries and has been certified Platinum by the International Federation of the Phonographic Industry for sales upwards of one million. According to the Official Charts Company, it topped the charts in both Scotland and the United Kingdom. In the latter country, the compilation spent 49 weeks charting and was ranked on the year-end sales charts for both 2002 and 2003 at positions 36 and 192, respectively. It was later certified double-platinum by the British Phonographic Industry for shipments of 600,000 copies. In the same continent, The Essential Barbra Streisand (or The Ultimate Collection in some European territories) topped the Irish Albums Chart, and reached the top ten in Belgium, Denmark, Finland, Germany, Greece, the Netherlands, Norway, and Sweden. In Oceania, the album peaked in Australia and New Zealand at numbers 5 and 3, respectively. Both countries issued the compilation double Platinum and platinum respectively.

When the album was reissued in 2007 and 2008 in several European countries, it debuted on the album charts in Austria, Italy, and Spain. In the first country, it reached the top twenty and peaked at number 11, and in Italy it peaked at number 75. In Spain, the album originally peaked at number 14 but reentered in 2013 at number 85.

Track listing

Personnel 
Personnel adapted from AllMusic.

 Barbra Streisand arranger, composer, executive producer, primary artist, producer
 Walter Afanasieff arranger, composer, producer
 Milton Ager composer
 Harold Arlen composer
 Billy Barnes composer
 Richard Baskin producer
 Alan Bergman composer, producer
 Marilyn Bergman composer, producer
 Michael Berniker producer
 Leonard Bernstein composer
 Don Black composer
 David Caddick conductor
 Charles Calello arranger, producer
 Ann Hampton Callaway composer
 John Cameron orchestration
 Truman Capote composer
 Jacques Charles composer
 Frank Churchill composer
 Grant Clarke composer
 Don Costa arranger, conductor
 David Cullen orchestration
 Nick DeCaro arranger
 Neil Diamond composer, guest artist, performer
 Céline Dion guest artist, performer
 Bob Esty arranger, composer, conductor, producer
 Peter Fletcher project manager
 David Foster arranger, composer, producer
 Ian Freebairn-Smith arranger
 Albhy Galuten producer
 Bob Gaudio producer
 Barry Gibb composer, guest artist, performer, producer
 Maurice Gibb composer
 Robin Gibb composer
 Jack Gold producer
 Wally Gold producer
 Alan Gordon composer
 Arthur Hamilton composer
 Marvin Hamlisch composer
 Oscar Hammerstein II composer
 Christopher Hampton composer
 James F. Hanley composer
 Charles Hart composer
 Jack Hayes string arrangements
 Rupert Holmes arranger, conductor, producer
 Paul Jabara composer, vocal arrangements
 Buddy Johnson composer
 Gary Klein producer
 Charles Koppelman executive producer
 Jay Landers executive producer
 Burton Lane composer
 Robert John "Mutt" Lange arranger, composer
 Michel Legrand arranger, composer, conductor, producer

 Alan Jay Lerner composer
 Jeffrey Lesser producer
 Ira Levin composer
 Alan Lindgren arranger, conductor
 Mort Lindsey arranger, conductor
 Tommy LiPuma producer
 Andrew Lloyd Webber composer, orchestration, producer
 Rolf Løvland composer
 Jeremy Lubbock conductor, orchestration
 Stephen Marcussen mastering
 Greg Mathieson arranger, conductor
 Peter Matz arranger, conductor, executive producer, orchestration, producer
 Bob Merrill composer
 Robert Mersey producer
 Larry Morey composer
 Jürg Morgenthaler composer
 Jerome Moross composer
 Trevor Nunn composer
 Laura Nyro composer
 Gene Page arranger
 Marty Paich arranger, producer
 Richard Parker composer
 Richard Perry producer
 Channing Pollack composer
 Phil Ramone producer
 Gabrielle Raumberger art direction
 Karl Richardson producer
 Nelson Riddle arranger, conductor
 Bruce Roberts composer, vocal arrangements
 Richard Rodgers composer
 Sigmund Romberg composer
 William Ross arranger, conductor, orchestral arrangements, producer
 Milton Schafer composer
 Walter Scharf arranger, conductor
 Cliff Singontiko design
 Stephen Sondheim composer
 Alan Stein A&R
 Richard Stilgoe composer
 Jule Styne composer
 Donna Summer guest artist, performer
 Linda Thompson-Jenner composer
 Jonathan Tunick arranger, conductor
 Luther Waters vocal arrangements
 Bobby Whiteside composer
 Stewart Whitmore digital editing
 Albert Willemetz composer
 Patrick Williams arranger, conductor
 Paul Williams composer
 Stevie Wonder composer
 Nigel Wright producer
 Jack Yellen composer
 Maurice Yvain composer

Charts

Weekly charts

Year-end charts

Certifications and sales

Release history

See also 
 List of UK Albums Chart number ones of the 2000s

References

Citations

Bibliography

External links 
 

2002 greatest hits albums
Barbra Streisand compilation albums
Columbia Records compilation albums